117° is the second studio album by American rock musician Izzy Stradlin, and his first not released under a band name, following the breakup of his post-Guns N' Roses group the Ju Ju Hounds. The album contains a cover of Chuck Berry's "Memphis, Tennessee."

The album features appearances from Stradlin's former Guns N' Roses bandmate Duff McKagan and former Ju Ju Hounds' bandmate Rick Richards. The tracks "Memphis, Tennessee" and "Good Enough" feature the Ju Ju Hounds lineup, as the songs were recorded by the band before breaking up.

Critical reception
AllMusic wrote that the album "rocks harder than most roots-rock albums of the late '90s." The Deseret News wrote that "lots of slide guitars, rip-roaring arrangements and drawling, wit-driven vocals give the 14 songs their charm." The Washington City Paper wrote that "there’s nothing groundbreaking on 117°, and Stradlin’s guitar work certainly falls short of being virtuosic, but there are worse things to listen to when you’re killing brain cells from dusk ’til dawn."

Track listing 
All lyrics and music by Izzy Stradlin, except where noted.
"Ain't It a Bitch" - 3:49
"Gotta Say" - 3:17
"Memphis" (Chuck Berry) - 2:58
"Old Hat" - 3:16
"Bleedin" - 3:15
"Parasite" - 1:39
"Good Enough" - 2:49
"117°" - 3:12
"Here Before You" - 3:47
"Up Jumped the Devil" (Barney Koumis/Ronnie Dawson) - 2:55
"Grunt" - 4:29
"Freight Train" - 3:25
"Methanol" (Stradlin/Rick Richards) - 3:29
"Surf Roach" (Stradlin/Joe Isbell) - 2:26

Japanese bonus tracks
Crackin' Up (Live)
Pressure Drop (Live)

Personnel 
Izzy Stradlin – lead vocals, rhythm guitar, bass on "117°" and "Grunt"
Rick Richards – lead guitar, lead vocals on the intro of "Here Before You"
Duff McKagan – bass (except 3, 7, 8 and 11)
Taz Bentley – drums (except 3 and 7)

Additional personnel
Jimmy Ashhurst – bass, backing vocals (tracks 3 and 7)
Charlie "Chalo" Quintana – drums (tracks 3 and 7)

References

1998 albums
Izzy Stradlin albums
Albums produced by Eddie Ashworth
Geffen Records albums